This is the results breakdown of the local elections held in Aragon on 27 May 2007. The following tables show detailed results in the autonomous community's most populous municipalities, sorted alphabetically.

Overall

City control
The following table lists party control in the most populous municipalities, including provincial capitals (shown in bold). Gains for a party are displayed with the cell's background shaded in that party's colour.

Municipalities

Calatayud
Population: 20,001

Huesca
Population: 49,312

Teruel
Population: 33,673

Zaragoza
Population: 646,546

See also
2007 Aragonese regional election

References

Aragon
2007